BSNL Broadband (formerly DataOne) is an Indian Wireline Broadband Operator, is division of Bharat Sanchar Nigam Limited which is under the ownership of Department of Telecommunications under Ministry of Communications of the Government of India. It provides both wired and wireless broadband services as well as many value added services. BSNL Broadband launched its services on 14 January 2005 as Data One. 

BSNL is commissioning a multi-gigabit, multi-protocol, IP infrastructure through National Internet Backbone-II (NIB-II), that provides services through the same backbone and broadband access network. The broadband service is available on digital subscriber line technology (on the same wire that is used for old telephone service), spanning 198 cities.

The services that are supported include always-on broadband access to the Internet for residential and business customers, content-based services, video multicasting, video-on-demand and interactive gaming, audio. In addition, video conferencing, IP telephony, distance learning, messaging, multi-site MPLS VPNs with Quality of Service (QoS) guarantees. The subscribers are able to access the above services through Subscriber Service Selection System (SSSS) portal. 

The service is given through Multi Protocol Label Switching (MPLS) based IP infrastructure. Layer 1 of the network consists of a high-speed backbone composed of 24 core routers connected with high-speed 2.0 Gbit/s(STM-16) links.

References

External links

Official BSNL Broadband site
Current BSNL Account Admin site

 

Internet service providers of India
Broadband